Su Li-chiung is a Taiwanese politician. She served as Deputy Minister of Labor from 28 November 2017 to 29 August 2018.

Education
Su obtained her bachelor's degree in ethno-sociology from National Chengchi University, master's degree in sociology from Tunghai University and doctoral degree in social work from the same university.

Political career
Su was the secretary-general of Taipei City Government, and served as the CEO of the organizing committees of 2017 Summer Universiade. Su was appointed deputy minister of labor on 28 November 2017 after the resignation of her predecessor Liau Huei-fang was approved by President Tsai Ing-wen a day before. She resigned the position on 29 August 2018. Su was later appointed deputy director of the Social and Family Affairs Administration and deputy minister of health and welfare. Su was nominated to the Control Yuan in June 2020.

References

Living people
Government ministers of Taiwan
Women government ministers of Taiwan
National Chengchi University alumni
Tunghai University alumni
Year of birth missing (living people)